Vila is a former civil parish in the municipality of Melgaço in the Viana do Castelo District, Portugal. In 2013, the parish merged into the new parish Vila e Roussas. It has a population of 1274 inhabitants and a total area of 1.76 km2.

References

Freguesias of Melgaço, Portugal